The Brownsville Bridge, also known as the Intercounty Bridge and the West Brownsville Bridge (most often heard in the high counties east of the river), is a truss bridge that carries vehicular traffic across the Monongahela River between Brownsville, Pennsylvania and West Brownsville, Pennsylvania. Since the opening of the Lane Bane Bridge and highway project to carry much of the intercounty through traffic away from the main streets of downtown Brownsville in the early 1960s, another commonly heard name is Old Brownsville Bridge for the four high level viaduct. 

The West Brownsville-Brownsville Bridge was completed in 1914 to replace an 1831 wooden structure that was ill-suited for the vehicular traffic that the National Road was beginning to carry, as motorized vehicle traffic began replacing animal powered transportation technologies.  The famous federal route has crossed the river at this point since its inception, with ferry service in the early nineteenth century.  In 1960, the Lane Bane Bridge was constructed just downstream and U.S. Route 40 was moved to the new high-level structure. Currently, the route serves local traffic and is meant to tie together the interconnected towns on each bank.

It is designated as a historic bridge by the Washington County History & Landmarks Foundation.

See also
List of bridges documented by the Historic American Engineering Record in Pennsylvania
List of crossings of the Monongahela River

References

External links

[ National Register nomination form]

Bridges over the Monongahela River
Bridges in Fayette County, Pennsylvania
Bridges in Washington County, Pennsylvania
Steel bridges in the United States
Bridges completed in 1913
Road bridges on the National Register of Historic Places in Pennsylvania
1913 establishments in Pennsylvania
Historic American Engineering Record in Pennsylvania
National Register of Historic Places in Washington County, Pennsylvania
National Register of Historic Places in Fayette County, Pennsylvania
History of Washington County, Pennsylvania
History of Fayette County, Pennsylvania
Pratt truss bridges in the United States